Tasisat Daryaei Futsal Club was an Iranian futsal club based in Tehran.

Season-by-season 
The table below chronicles the achievements of the club in various competitions.

Notes:
* unofficial titles
1 worst title in history of club

Key

P   = Played
W   = Games won
D   = Games drawn
L   = Games lost

GF  = Goals for
GA  = Goals against
Pts = Points
Pos = Final position

Honors 
National:
 Iranian Futsal Super League
 Champions (2): 2014-15 - 2015-16
 Runners-up (1): 2017–18
 Iran Futsal's 1st Division
 Champions (1): 2012-13

Continental:
 AFC Futsal Club Championship
 Champions (1): 2015
 AFC futsal team of the year (1): 2015

Individual
 Best player:
 Asian Futsaler of the Year:
 2015 –  Vahid Shamsaei
 AFC Futsal Club Championship MVP Award:
 2015 -  Vahid Shamsaei
 Iranian Futsal Super League
 2017-18 –  Mahdi Javid
 Top Goalscorer:
 Iranian Futsal Super League:
 2015–16 Iranian Futsal Super League:  Ali Asghar Hassanzadeh (29)
 2017–18 Iranian Futsal Super League:  Mahdi Javid (35)
 AFC Futsal Club Championship:
 2015 AFC Futsal Club Championship:  Vahid Shamsaei  (10)
 Best Team:
 AFC futsal team of the 2015
 Best Team of the 2016–17 Iranian Futsal Super League

First-team squad

References

External links
Official website
Tasisat Daryaei's Stats and History in PersianLeague

Futsal clubs in Iran
Sport in Tehran
Futsal clubs established in 2012
2012 establishments in Iran